The Spanish Armada (a.k.a. the Enterprise of England) was a Spanish fleet that sailed from Lisbon in late May 1588, commanded by the Duke of Medina Sidonia, an aristocrat without previous naval experience appointed by Philip II of Spain. His orders were to sail up the English Channel, link up with the Duke of Parma in Flanders, and escort an invasion force that would land in England and overthrow Elizabeth I.  Its purpose was to reinstate Catholicism in England, end support for the Dutch Republic, and prevent attacks by English and Dutch privateers against Spanish interests in the Americas.

The Spanish were opposed by an English fleet based in Plymouth. Faster and more manoeuvrable than the larger Spanish galleons, they were able to attack the Armada as it sailed up the Channel. Several subordinates advised Medina Sidonia to anchor in The Solent and occupy the Isle of Wight, but he refused to deviate from his instructions to link up with Parma. Although the Armada reached Calais largely intact, while awaiting communication from Parma, it was attacked at night by English fire ships and forced to scatter.

The Armada suffered further losses in the ensuing Battle of Gravelines, and was in danger of running aground on the Dutch coast when the wind changed, allowing it to escape into the North Sea. Pursued by the English, the Spanish ships returned home via Scotland and Ireland. Up to 24 ships were wrecked along the way before the rest managed to get home.

The expedition was the largest engagement of the undeclared Anglo-Spanish War. The following year, England organized a similar large-scale campaign against Spain, the English Armada, sometimes called the "counter-Armada of 1589", which was also a failure.

Etymology

Background
By the mid sixteenth century Habsburg Spain under King Philip II was a dominant political and military power in Europe, with a global empire which became the source of her wealth. It championed the Catholic cause and its global possessions stretched from Europe, the Americas and to the Philippines. This was expanded further in 1580 when Portugal was annexed thus forming the Iberian Union, greatly expanding the empire. Philip became the first monarch who ruled over an empire upon which the sun did not set, and he did so from his chambers in the Escorial Palace by means of written communication.

In comparison England was only a minor European power with no empire, and it could exercise little influence over its shores. King Henry VIII began the English Reformation as a political exercise over his desire to divorce his first wife, Catherine of Aragon. Over time, England became increasingly aligned with the Protestant reformation taking place in Europe, especially during the reign of Henry's son, Edward VI. Edward died childless, and his half-sister Mary ascended the throne in 1553. Three years later Mary married Philip II, becoming queen consort of Spain and began to reassert Roman Catholic influence over church affairs. Her attempts led to more than 260 people being burned at the stake, earning her the nickname "Bloody Mary".

Mary's death in 1558 led to her half-sister Elizabeth taking the throne. Unlike Mary, Elizabeth was firmly in the reformist camp and quickly reimplemented many of Edward's reforms. Philip, no longer co-monarch, deemed Elizabeth a heretic and illegitimate ruler of England. In the eyes of the Catholic Church, Henry had never officially divorced Catherine, making Elizabeth illegitimate. It is alleged that Philip supported plots to have Elizabeth overthrown in favour of her Catholic cousin and heir presumptive, Mary, Queen of Scots. These plans were thwarted when Elizabeth had Mary imprisoned in 1567. Mary was forced to abdicate the crown of Scotland in favour of her son James VI. The first documented suggestion of what was called the Enterprise of England was in the summer of 1583 when, flushed with pride of his victory in the Azores, Álvaro de Bazán, Marquis of Santa Cruz addressed the suggestion to Philip II of taking advantage of it to attack England.

Elizabeth finally had Mary executed in February 1587, due to constant plots against the queen carried out in Mary's name. Elizabeth also retaliated against Philip by supporting the Dutch Revolt against Spain, as well as funding privateers to raid Spanish ships across the Atlantic. She had also negotiated an enduring trade and political alliance with Morocco.

In retaliation, Philip planned an expedition to invade England in order to overthrow Elizabeth and, if the Armada was not entirely successful, at least negotiate freedom of worship for Catholics and financial compensation for war in the Low Countries. Through this endeavour, English material support for the United Provinces, the part of the Low Countries that had successfully seceded from Spanish rule, and English attacks on Spanish trade and settlements in the New World would end. Philip was supported by Pope Sixtus V, who treated the invasion as a crusade, with the promise of a subsidy should the Armada make land. Substantial support for the invasion was also expected from English Catholics, including wealthy and influential aristocrats and traders.

A raid on Cádiz, led by privateer Francis Drake in April 1587, had captured or destroyed about 30 ships and great quantities of supplies, setting preparations back by a year. There is also evidence that a letter from Elizabeth's security chief and spymaster, Sir Francis Walsingham, to her ambassador in Istanbul, William Harborne, sought to initiate Ottoman Empire fleet manoeuvres to harass the Spaniards, but there is no evidence for the success of that plan.

The Prince of Parma was initially consulted by Philip II in 1583. Alexander stressed that three conditions would need to be met so as to achieve success; absolute secrecy, secure the possession and defense of the Dutch provinces, and keep the French from interfering either with a peace agreement or by sowing division between the Catholic League and the Huguenots. Secrecy couldn't be maintained which made the enterprise vastly more complicated. Philip ultimately combined Parma's plan with that of Santa Cruz, initially entertaining a triple attack, starting with a diversionary raid on Scotland, while the main Armada would capture either the Isle of Wight or Southampton to establish a safe anchorage in The Solent. Farnese would then follow with a large army from the Low Countries crossing the English Channel.

The appointed commander of the naval forces of the Armada was the highly experienced Marquis of Santa Cruz while Alexander Farnese would be in command of the invasion forces. Unfortunately, Santa Cruz died in February 1588 and the Duke of Medina Sidonia, a high-born courtier, took his place. While a competent soldier and distinguished administrator, Medina Sidonia had no naval experience. He wrote to Philip expressing grave doubts about the planned campaign, but his message was prevented from reaching the King by courtiers on the grounds that God would ensure the Armada's success.

Execution

Prior to the undertaking, Pope Sixtus V allowed Philip to collect crusade taxes and granted his men indulgences. The blessing of the Armada's banner on April 25, 1588, was similar to the ceremony used prior to the Battle of Lepanto in 1571. On May 28, 1588, the Armada set sail from Lisbon and headed for the English Channel. When it left Lisbon, the fleet was composed of 141 ships, 10,138 sailors and 19,315 soldiers, and bore 1,500 brass guns and 1,000 iron guns. The full body of the fleet took two days to leave port.

The Armada was delayed by bad weather. Storms in the Bay of Biscay along the Galician coast forced four galleys and one galleon to turn back, and other ships had to put in to A Coruña for repairs, leaving 137 ships that sailed for the English Channel. Nearly half of the ships were not built as warships and were used for duties such as scouting and dispatch work, or for carrying supplies, animals and troops. It included 24 purpose-built warships, 44 armed merchantmen, 38 auxiliary vessels and 34 supply ships.

In the Spanish Netherlands, Alexander Farnese had mustered 30,000 soldiers and ordered hundreds of flyboats built to carry them across the channel while awaiting the arrival of the Armada. Since the element of surprise was long gone, the new plan was to use the cover of the warships to convey the army on barges to a place near London. In all, 55,000 men were to have been mustered, a huge army for that time. On the day the Armada set sail, Elizabeth's ambassador in the Netherlands, Valentine Dale, met Parma's representatives in peace negotiations. The English made a vain effort to intercept the Armada in the Bay of Biscay. On July 6, negotiations were abandoned, and the English fleet stood prepared, if ill-supplied, at Plymouth, awaiting news of Spanish movements.

Only 122 ships from the Spanish fleet entered the Channel; the four galleys, one nao, five pataches and the 10 Portuguese caravels had left the fleet before the first encounter with the English fleet. An additional 5 pataches, dispatched to deliver messages to Parma, should be deducted which brings the number to 117 Spanish ships facing the roughly 226-strong English fleet. The Spanish fleet outgunned that of the English with 50% more available firepower than the English. The English fleet consisted of the 34 ships of the Royal Fleet, 21 of which were galleons of 200 to 400 tons, and 163 other ships, 30 of which were of 200 to 400 tons and carried up to 42 guns each. Twelve of the ships were privateers owned by Lord Howard of Effingham, Sir John Hawkins and Sir Francis Drake.

In the beginning of June, Parma had sent Captain Moresin with some pilots to Admiral Sedonia. Upon Moresin's return on June 22, the report he made to Farnese caused him distress. Medina Sedonia was under the impression that Farnese could simply sail out into the channel with his barges filled with troops. Parma had continually informed the king that his passage to the channel was blocked by English and Dutch ships, and the only way he could bring his boats out was if the Armada cleared the blockade.

The fleet was sighted in England on July 29, when it appeared off the Lizard in Cornwall. The news was conveyed to London by a system of beacons that had been constructed along the south coast. The same day the English fleet was trapped in Plymouth Harbour by the incoming tide. The Spanish convened a council of war, where it was proposed to ride into the harbour on the tide and incapacitate the defending ships at anchor. From Plymouth Harbour the Spanish would attack England, but Philip explicitly forbade Medina Sidonia from engaging, leaving the Armada to sail on to the east and toward the Isle of Wight. As the tide turned, 55 English ships set out to confront the Armada from Plymouth under the command of Lord Howard of Effingham, with Sir Francis Drake as vice admiral. The rear admiral was Sir John Hawkins.

Action off Plymouth
On July 30, the English fleet was off Eddystone Rocks with the Armada upwind to the west. To execute its attack, the English tacked upwind of the Armada, thus gaining the weather gage, a significant advantage. At daybreak on July 31, the English fleet engaged the Armada off Plymouth near the Eddystone Rocks. The Armada was in a crescent-shaped defensive formation, convex toward the east. The galleons and great ships were concentrated in the centre and at the tips of the crescent's horns, giving cover to the transports and supply ships in between.

Given the Spanish advantage in close-quarter fighting, the English kept beyond grappling range and bombarded the Spanish ships from a distance with cannon fire. The distance was too great for the manoeuvre to be effective and, at the end of the first day's fighting neither fleet had lost a ship in action. The English caught up with the Spanish fleet after a day of sailing.

Actions of Portland Bill and Isle of Wight

The English fleet and the Armada engaged once more on August 1, off Portland. A change of wind gave the Spanish the weather gage, and they sought to close with the English, but were foiled by the smaller ships' greater manoeuvrability. While the Spanish center manoeuvred to support the Santa Ana, the Nuestra Señora del Rosario collided with a number of ships, losing her bowsprit and setting in motion a series of mishaps. She began to drift, and was taken off by the current in the opposite direction to the fleet and closer to the English. Drake in the Revenge sailed to the Rosario during the night and she was taken in action; Admiral Pedro de Valdés (commander of the Squadron of Andalusia) surrendered along with his entire crew. On board, the English seized supplies of much-needed gunpowder and 50,000 gold ducats. Drake had been guiding the English fleet by means of a lantern, which he snuffed out to slip away from the Spanish ships, causing the rest of his fleet to become scattered and disarrayed by dawn. At one point, Howard formed his ships into a line of battle to attack at close range, bringing all his guns to bear, but he did not follow through with the maneuver and little was achieved. During a lull in battle, San Salvador'''s gunpowder magazine exploded, lighting a portion of the ship on fire. The Spanish attempted to scuttle the ship, but this failed when the Golden Hind came up. The Spanish evacuated the vessel and the Golden Hind promptly captured her.

If the Armada could create a temporary base in the protected waters of the Solent, the strait separating the Isle of Wight from the English mainland, it could wait there for word from Parma's army; Farnese did not get news of this until August 6. However, in a full-scale attack, the English fleet broke into four groups with Martin Frobisher of the ship Aid given command over a squadron, and Drake coming with a large force from the south. Medina Sidonia sent reinforcements south and ordered the Armada back to open sea to avoid the Owers shoals. There were no other secure harbours further east along England's south coast, so the Armada was compelled to make for Calais, without being able to wait for word of Parma's army.

Starting on the 1st of August Sidonia began sending Farnese messages detailing his position and movements. It was not until the following day that Alexander received the first report from the Admiral.

Fireships at Calais

On August 7, the Armada anchored off Calais in a tightly packed defensive crescent formation, not far from Dunkirk (Farnese only learned of this on that same afternoon) where Parma's army, reduced by disease to 16,000, was expected to be waiting, ready to join the fleet in barges sent from ports along the Flemish coast. An essential element of the plan of invasion, as it was eventually implemented, was the transportation of a large part of Parma's Army of Flanders as the main invasion force in unarmed barges across the English Channel. These barges would be protected by the large ships of the Armada. However, to get to the Armada, they would have to cross the zone dominated by the Dutch navy, where the Armada could not go. This problem seems to have been overlooked by the Armada commanders, but it was insurmountable. Communication was more difficult than anticipated, and word came too late that Parma's army had yet to be equipped with sufficient transport or to be assembled in the port, a process that would take at least six days. As Medina Sidonia waited at anchor, Dunkirk was blockaded by a Dutch fleet of 30 flyboats under Lieutenant-Admiral Justinus van Nassau. The Dutch flyboats mainly operated in the shallow waters off Zeeland and Flanders where larger warships with a deeper draught, like the Spanish and English galleons, could not safely enter. Parma expected the Armada to send its light pataches to drive away the Dutch, but Medina Sidonia would not send them because he feared he would need these ships for his own protection. There was no deep-water port where the fleet might shelter, which had been acknowledged as a major difficulty for the expedition, and the Spanish found themselves vulnerable as night drew on.

The Dutch enjoyed an unchallenged naval advantage in these waters, even though their navy was inferior in naval armament. Because Medina Sidonia did not attempt to break the Dutch blockade and Parma would not risk attempting the passage unescorted, the Army of Flanders escaped the trap that Van Nassau had in mind for them.

In the middle of the night of August 7–8, the English set alight eight fireships, sacrificing warships by filling them with pitch, brimstone, gunpowder and tar, and cast them downwind among the closely anchored vessels of the Armada. The Spanish feared that these uncommonly large fireships were "hellburners", specialised fireships filled with large gunpowder charges that had been used to deadly effect at the Siege of Antwerp. Three were intercepted by pataches and towed away, but the remainder bore down on the fleet. Medina Sidonia's flagship and the principal warships held their positions, but the rest of the fleet cut their anchor cables and scattered in confusion. No Spanish ships were burnt, but the crescent formation had been broken, and the fleet found itself too far leeward of Calais in the rising southwesterly wind to recover its position. The English closed in for battle. Farnese learned of this the following day

Battle of Gravelines

The small port of Gravelines was part of Flanders in the Spanish Netherlands close to the border with France, and was the closest Spanish territory to England.

Before dawn on August 8, Medina Sidonia struggled to regather his fleet after the fireships scattered it, and was reluctant to sail further east than Gravelines, knowing the danger of running aground on the shoals off Flanders, from which his Dutch enemies had removed the sea marks. The English learned of the Armada's weaknesses during the skirmishes in the English Channel, and concluded it was possible to close in to within  to be able to penetrate the oak hulls of the Spanish warships. They had spent most of their gunpowder in the first engagements and had, after the Isle of Wight, been forced to conserve their heavy shot and powder for an anticipated attack near Gravelines. During all the engagements, the Spanish heavy guns could not easily be reloaded because of their close spacing and the quantities of supplies stowed between decks, as Drake had discovered on capturing the Nuestra Señora del Rosario in the Channel. Instead, the Spanish gunners fired once and then transferred to their main task, which was to board enemy ships, as had been the practice in naval warfare at the time. Evidence from Armada wrecks in Ireland shows that much of the fleet's ammunition was unused. Their determination to fight by boarding, rather than employing cannon fire at a distance, proved a disadvantage for the Spanish. The manoeuver had been effective in the battles of Lepanto and Ponta Delgada earlier in the decade, but the English were aware of it and sought to avoid it by keeping their distance.

While Medina Sidonia was gathering the Armada ships together into their traditional crescent formation the English fleet moved in, and at dawn the flagship with four other ships found themselves facing the entire English fleet. The English provoked Spanish fire while staying out of range. The English then closed, firing damaging broadsides into the enemy ships, all the while maintaining a windward position, so the heeling Armada hulls were exposed to damage below the water line when they changed course later. Many of the Spanish gunners were killed or wounded by the English broadsides, and the task of manning the cannon often fell to foot soldiers who did not know how to operate them. The ships were close enough for sailors on the upper decks of the English and Spanish ships to exchange musket fire. A couple of hours into the battle, a few more Armada warships closed in to form wings on either side of the five ships already under attack. After eight hours, the English ships began to run out of ammunition, and some gunners began loading objects such as chains into their cannons. Around 4 pm, the English fired their last shots and pulled back.

Five Spanish and Portuguese ships were lost: one carrack the 605 ton Maria Juan which had been part of Don Diego Flores de Valdes' Castile Squadron which had attempted to surrender to Captain Robert Crosse of the Hope, sank off Blankenberge with the loss of 275 men - the Spanish only managing to rescue a boatload of survivors. The galleass San Lorenzo, the flagship of Don Hugo de Moncada which had been holed below the waterline was forced to run aground at Calais to avoid sinking. Howard on sight of this ordered a flotilla of ship's boats to carry her by boarding. Moncada was killed during an exchange of small arms fire: an arquebus shot to his head. The ship was then taken after murderous fighting between the crew, galley slaves and the English. The French meanwhile could do little except to watch as the ship was plundered but they opened fire to ward off the English who quickly left to join the rest of the fight. The next day the severely crippled galleon San Mateo ran aground in between Sluis and Ostend - and was taken by a combination of Dutch ships and English troops led by Francis Vere  The captain Don Diego Pimmental surrendered along with the survivors of his crew. Later that day the equally crippled San Felipe commanded by Maestre de Campo Don Fransico De Toldeo drifted away sinking also running aground on the island of Walcheren from which English troops sortied from Flushing attacked the stricken vessel and took the crew prisoners. A Dutch force of flyboats led by Justinus van Nassau then took possession of the ship. A pinnace also ran aground by her crew to prevent her from sinking.

Many other Spanish ships were severely damaged, especially the Portuguese and some Spanish Atlantic-class galleons, including some Neapolitan galleys, which bore the brunt of the fighting during the early hours of the battle, Spanish – Nuestra Señora del Rosario, San Salvador, La María Juan; Naples – San Lorenzo; Portuguese – São Mateus, São Filipe and the Spanish plan to join with Parma's army had been frustrated.

 Elizabeth's Tilbury speech 

Because of the potential invasion from the Netherlands, Robert Dudley, Earl of Leicester assembled a force of 4,500 militia at West Tilbury, Essex, to defend the Thames Estuary against any incursion up-river toward London. The result of the English fireship attack and the sea battle of Gravelines had not yet reached England, so Elizabeth went to Tilbury on August 18 to review her forces, arriving on horseback in ceremonial armor to imply to the militia that she was prepared to lead them in the ensuing battle. She gave them her royal address, which survives in at least six slightly different versions. One version is as follows:

Armada in Scotland and Ireland

On the day after the battle at Gravelines, the disorganized and unmaneuverable Spanish fleet was at risk of running onto the sands of Zeeland because of the prevailing wind. The wind then changed to the south, enabling the fleet to sail north. The English ships under Howard pursued to prevent any landing on English soil, although by this time his ships were almost out of shot. On August 12, Howard called a halt to the pursuit at about the latitude of the Firth of Forth off Scotland. The only option left to the Spanish ships was to return to Spain by sailing round the north of Scotland and home via the Atlantic or the Irish Sea. As the Spanish fleet rounded Scotland it on August 20, it consisted of 110 vessels and most made it around. The San Juan de Sicilia, heavily damaged during the Gravelines engagement had struggled North and limped into Tobermory bay on the Isle of Mull on 23 September but was later destroyed by an English agent sent by Sir Francis Walsingham with most of the crew on board.

The Spanish ships were beginning to show wear from the long voyage, and some were kept together by strengthening their damaged hulls with cables. Supplies of food and water ran short. The intention would have been to keep to the west of the coasts of Scotland and Ireland, seeking the relative safety of the open sea. There being no way of accurately measuring longitude, the Spanish were not aware that the Gulf Stream was carrying them north and east as they tried to move west, and they eventually turned south much closer to the coast than they thought. Off Scotland and Ireland, the fleet ran into a series of powerful westerly winds which drove many of the damaged ships further toward the lee shore. Because so many anchors had been abandoned during the escape from the English fireships off Calais, many of the ships were incapable of securing shelter as the fleet reached the coast of Ireland and were driven onto the rocks; local inhabitants looted the ships. The late sixteenth century and especially 1588 was marked by unusually strong North Atlantic storms, perhaps associated with a high accumulation of polar ice off the coast of Greenland, a feature of the "Little Ice Age". More ships and sailors were lost to cold and stormy weather than in direct combat.

Most of the 28 ships lost in the storms were along the jagged steep rocks of the western coast of Ireland. About 5,000 men died by drowning, starvation and slaughter by local inhabitants after their ships were driven ashore on the west coasts of Scotland and Ireland. The English Lord Deputy William FitzWilliam ordered the English soldiers in Ireland to kill any Spanish prisoners, which was done on several occasions instead of asking for ransom as was common during that period. Reports of the passage of the remnants of the Spanish Armada around Ireland abound with onerous accounts of hardships and survival. One of the costliest wrecks was that of the ship  Spanish galleass La Girona, which was driven on to Lacada Point in County Antrim on the night of October 26. Of the estimated 1,300 people on board, there were nine survivors. 260 bodies washed ashore, including Alonso Martínez de Leiva, knight and trece of the Order of Santiago. Captain Francisco de Cuéllar was wrecked on the coast of Ireland and gave a remarkable account of his experiences in the fleet, on the run in Ireland, defeat of an English army besieging Rosclogher castle, flight through Scotland, surviving a second shipwreck and ultimate return to Spain.

Return to Spain

Continental Europe had been anxiously awaiting news of the Armada all summer. The Spanish postmaster and Spanish agents in Rome promoted reports of Spanish victory in hopes of convincing Pope Sixtus V to release his promised of one million ducats upon landing of troops. In France, the Spanish and English ambassadors promoted contradictory narratives in the press, and a Spanish victory was incorrectly celebrated in Paris, Prague, and Venice. It was not until late August that reliable reports of the Spanish defeat arrived in major cities and were widely believed.

The first rumours of a setback for the armada began to reach Spain when news of the English fireships breaking the Spanish formation at Calais but this was disbelieved. The King noted I hope God has not permitted so much evil. Nothing was heard for nearly two weeks and it wasn't until September 21 that the first of the ships of the Armada began to arrive into Spain - the first of eight limped into Coruña which included Medina Sidonia's San Martin. Over the next few days Diego Flores took 22 more into Laredo harbour and Miguel de Oquendo bought five more into the port of Guipuzcoa.

By mid-October it was becoming more apparent for the Spanish that few if any more of the remaining missing ships of the armada would return. Even in November three months after the battles through the Channel, a few Spanish ships were still attempting the journey home. One of the last, the Spanish hospital ship San Pedro El Mayor carrying some 200 sick and wounded survivors limped into Hope Cove in Devon on November 7 - the commander trying to find a suitable place to ground her. The crew were taken prisoner and the sick were treated in Bodmin and Plympton.

Aftermath

After the Duke of Parma was certain that the Armada had sailed away from the coast of Flanders and his participation in the invasion project was no longer feasible, he ordered his soldiers to disembark so as to avoid an epidemic of disease. He then assembled his Council of War to discuss what endeavours his forces could be used for before the onset of winter. In late September he divided them into three groups; one sent to the Rhine, one to remain in the coastal region and one led by Parma himself to capture Bergen-op-Zoom. There in November he was repelled with heavy losses by the Anglo-Dutch garrison, and combined with poor weather was forced to abandon the siege. An attempt to take the Dutch held island of Tholen was also repelled. From the armada campaign to Bergen, Parma's forces had lost some 10,000 men killed or dead from disease.

England and the Netherlands
Even though the Spanish armada had failed to invade England it had demonstrated its feasibility, and that the British Isles overall were vulnerable to attack.

The day after her Tilbury speech, Elizabeth ordered the army disbanded, the camp at Tilbury dissolved five days later, then discharged the navy, sending them home without pay. All the while, the costs of this defensive effort were mounting — the total was nearly £400,000 — and measures were put in motion to mitigate it. Typhus, scurvy and dysentery swept the through the crews and many died of disease and starvation after landing at Margate. For instance, of the Elizabeth Bonaventure's crew of 500, more than 200 had died and the Elizabeth Jonas had just one living from the crew that it had sailed with.  Howard wrote to Burghley, it would grieve any man's heart to see them that have served so valiantly die so miserably. Hawkins also weighed in and accused Burghley "that by death, by discharging of sick men, and such like, that there may be spared something in the general pay." The men had to rely on the charity of their officers, and Howard set an example by doing what he could out of his own purse to help the sailors. Nevertheless upwards of 3,000 perished. As a result the Chatham Chest was set up - its purpose to help pay pensions to disabled seamen.

It took some time for the scale of the victory to be realized as news began to filter through by the end of August and beginning of September. As a result a number of thanksgiving services were held at Cathedrals and Churches throughout England. At St Paul's Cathedral in London a series of thanksgivings took place, the first on August 30 where a sermon was preached, followed by another on September 18. As news of the full scale of the disaster came through, and also news of England's victory against Parma at Bergen-Op-Zoom, a bigger National service of thanksgiving took place on November 29. A second and final thanksgiving took place five days later which saw a royal procession of the Queen in a chariot through the streets of London. Twelve Spanish standards and other trophies which had been captured from the ships of the armada, decorated the choir of St Paul during the huge service.

The captured Spanish galleons Nuestra Señora del Rosario and the San Salvador were studied by the English. The San Salvador became known as the 'Great Spaniard' but was lost in a wreck in November 1588 off Studland. Nuestra Señora del Rosario was brought to Dartmouth. The 397 crew were taken to Torre Abbey near Torquay where they were held prisoner in a barn (today called the 'Spanish Barn') and spared execution. The Rosario was later sent to Chatham where she was dry docked and eventually sunk to support a wharf. Pedro de Valdés was held prisoner in the Tower of London for five years, until his ransom was paid by his family for his release back to Spain. He was not blamed for the loss of his ship and was appointed colonial governor of Cuba from 1602 to 1608.

The Dutch also celebrated the victory and their artists were quick to take on commemorative medals and paintings which were soon circulated within the year. The wrecked Spanish galleons San Mateo and San Felipe which had run aground were both found to be riddled with holes by cannonballs that had struck below the waterline. Both ships were too damaged to be salvaged and were therefore broken up - the cannons were used by the Dutch in nearby fortresses. The main-topmast rigging banner from the San Matteo - part of which depicts 'Christ on the Cross', was taken, hung and displayed in the choir of St Peters Church in Leiden. It now resides in the Museum De Lakenhal.

Spain
The news of the disaster brought shock and despair and the nation went into mourning. Its defeat was even more devastating because hopes of its success had been raised by false rumours. These included Drake and Howard being taken prisoner, the Isle of Wight and Plymouth taken and Parma's army even approaching London. The King took the news hard and shut himself away for days - the daily business of government was also brought to an abrupt halt. The King is claimed to have said: "I sent the Armada against men, not God's winds and waves". News of the loss of La Girona bore more despair for Philip, the loss of not only De Leiva but also his followers from almost every noble house in Spain had also drowned with him.

The number of ships lost have been debated - a detailed study by Spanish naval historian Fernandez Duro in the mid 1880's claimed that 63 in total were lost. Historian José Luis Casado Soto examined the fate of each ship creating individual dossiers and claimed that 35 ships were lost. In addition it was noted that of the 122 Armada ships that entered the English Channel, 87 returned from their voyage through the Channel and around the British isles. However these figures don't include eight that were unaccounted for. Other historians have done further research; Neil Hanson, Robert Hutchinson, Colin Martin and Geoffrey Parker all researched the Armada ships that had returned coming to the same conclusion. The overall figure of between 44 and 51 ships being lost overall - with more detailed breakdowns in the number of ships that set sail along with their fate. That figure being a third of the fleet had been sunk, captured, wrecked or scuttled. American historian Garrett Mattingly noted that only 66 ships returned to Spain, with another returning later in the year. The losses did not include the smaller vulnerable ships like the pataches and zarbas, of which around seventeen were lost. Even though most of the ships had returned, many of them were severely damaged from either the storms, and English gunfire. One hulk the Doncella sank after they had cast anchor in Santander, and the Santa Anna was accidentally burned within a few days of entering San Sebastian. In addition the severely damaged galleons San Marcos and San Francisco were broken up, the guns and the timber being sold off. As many as half of the fleet were unfit for further service and as a result a number were scuttled, broken up or left to rot.

Furthermore, Spanish sources state that no more than 11,000 perished. Philip's administrators, bureaucrats and secretaries documented, dated and filed everything that went on in all corners of the Spanish empire, and all those records are still kept in the National Archives of Spain and the Escorial. The number of men lost was extracted from the paymaster distribution lists. A detailed analysis of the human cost of the campaign reveals that 25,696 men left Coruña and 13,399 returned.

Even after arrival the men were near death from disease, as the conditions were very cramped, and most of the ships had run out of food and water. More Armada survivors later died in Spain or on hospital ships in Spanish harbours from diseases contracted during the voyage. A large number of prominent Spanish commanders also died, many after having arrived in port. Vice Admiral of the fleet and commander of the Guipuzcoa Squadron, Miguel de Oquendo suffering from battle wounds and a fever, died at Coruña two days after arriving. Another was the Biscayan squadron commander Juan Martínez de Recalde, who also succumbed the same way. The Duke of Medina Sidonia also fell ill on his return and nearly succumbed; he was not blamed by Philip, who allowed him to return home to convalesce. Hutchinson claimed that the number of survivors was just over 50% but these numbers however do not include the Portuguese, the Neapolitans and the galley slaves. while Hanson claimed that fewer than 10,000 men (38%) survived the expedition.

English Counter Armada

The following year the English with Dutch conscripts launched the Counter Armada, under Sir Francis Drake and Sir John Norris with three tasks:
 Destroy the battered Spanish Atlantic fleet, which was being repaired in ports of northern Spain
 Make a landing at Lisbon, Portugal and raise a revolt there against King Philip II (Philip I of Portugal) installing the pretender Dom António, Prior of Crato to the Portuguese throne
 Take the Azores if possible so as to establish a permanent base.
None of the objectives were achieved. The attempt to restore the Portuguese Crown from Spain was unsuccessful, and the opportunity to strike a decisive blow against the weakened Spanish Navy was lost. The expedition depleted the financial resources of England's treasury, which had been carefully restored during the long reign of Elizabeth I, and its failure was so embarrassing that, even today, England barely acknowledges it ever happened. Through this lost opportunity, Philip was able revive his navy the very next year, sending 37 ships with 6,420 men to Brittany where they established a base of operations on the Blavet river. The English and Dutch ultimately failed to disrupt the various fleets of the Indies despite the great number of military personnel mobilized every year. Thus, Spain remained the predominant power in Europe for several decades.

Course of the war
During the course of the war, the Spanish struggled to gain control of the English Channel or stop the English intervention in Flanders or English privateer transatlantic raids. From their base in Brittany, Spanish corsairs did make several incursions on the English coast and plundered English and Dutch ships. The Spanish launched a number of small scale attacks such as the Raid on Mount's Bay in Cornwall on July 26, 1595, where over two days, Penzance, Newlyn, Mousehole, and Paul were raided and torched. Another smaller raid on Cawsand bay, also in Cornwall, took place the following year but ended in failure. In June 1596 England and the United Dutch Provinces sent a second Armada to Spain, where they seized and held Cadiz for two weeks causing economic losses, but failed to seize the treasure fleet. After this, three more armadas were sent by Spain - the second sent in 1596 (126-140 ships) was scattered by a storm, as was the third sent the following year (140 ships), with a number captured or sunk by the English fleet. The last Armada (33 ships) sent in October 1601 to Ireland, ended with the surrender at Kinsale three months later. The conflict then wound down with diminishing military actions, finally ending with the signing of the Treaty of London in August 1604.

Technological revolution

The Spanish had 117 ships to go up against 200+ English ships. The opposing forces were experienced in completely different fighting styles. The Spanish style can be studied from the Battle of Lepanto. Their tactics were to fire one cannon volley, ram and grapple the enemy ship, board, then engage in hand to hand combat. In contrast, the English style was taking advantage of the wind (the "weather gage") and line-to-line cannon fire from windward, which exposed the opponent ship's hull and rudder as targets. Also instilled was the use of naval cannon to damage enemy ships without the need to board. Until then, the cannon had played a supporting role to the main tactic of ramming and boarding enemy ships. The failure of the Spanish Armada vindicated the English strategy and caused a revolution in naval tactics. The English also had the advantage of fighting close to home which they could be easily and frequently get resupplied so as not to be weighed down, unlike the Armada ships which were loaded with all the materiel needed for their invasion force to wage a ground based war. Nevertheless, when the fleets actually came to blows at the battle of Gravelines, the Armada was out numbered 10:1, and during the 8-hour fight, the English managed to sink one carrack and forced two galleons, a pinnace and an armed merchant to run aground. Despite those odds, not once did the Armada turn away from a fight; each time it challenged the English fleet, the latter raised its sails to keep its distance. Furthermore, after the final engagement with the English fleet, the Spanish fleet sailed away retaining its ability to effectively wage war.

Most military historians hold that the battle of Gravelines reflected a lasting shift in the balance of naval power in favour of the English, in part because of the gap in naval technology and cannon armament which continued into the next century. In the words of historian Geoffrey Parker, by 1588, "the capital ships of the Elizabethan navy constituted the most powerful battlefleet afloat anywhere in the world". The English navy yards were leaders in technical innovation, and the captains devised new battle formations and tactics. The sleeker and more manoeuvrable full-rigged ship, with ample cannon, was one of the greatest advances of the century and permanently transformed naval warfare.

Whereas before warships had tried to grapple with each other so soldiers could board the enemy ship, they were able to stand off and fire broadside cannonades that could sink the vessel. English ships and seamanship had foiled the invasion. The English also benefited from Spain's unworkable strategy that required coordination between the invasion fleet and the Spanish army on shore yet didn't seem to have learned from that mistake since they attempted the same tactic in Portugal the very next year; the English army under Norris' command marching on Lisbon expecting Drake to simultaneously attack the city with his ships. The outdated design of the Spanish cannon meant that they were much slower in reloading in a close-range battle, allowing the English to take control. Spain still had numerically larger fleets, but England was catching up.

Legacy
In England the victory prompted a huge David vs Goliath propaganda offensive, and its exploitation boosted national pride which lasted for years. Elizabeth's legend persisted and grew long after her death. It also may have given heart to the Protestant cause across Europe and the belief that God was behind the Protestants. This was shown by the striking of commemorative medals that bore variations on the inscription, "1588. Flavit Jehovah et Dissipati Sunt" – with "Jehovah" in Hebrew letters ("God blew, and they are scattered"), or "He blew with His winds, and they were scattered". There were also more lighthearted medals struck, such as the one with the play on the words of Julius Caesar: Venit, Vidit, Fugit (he came, he saw, he fled). The wind that scattered the Armada has been called the Protestant Wind, a phrase also used for later invasions of England that failed.

The memory of the victory over the Armada was evoked during both the Napoleonic Wars and the Second World War, when Britain again faced a substantial danger of foreign invasion. During the Battle of Britain RAF fighter pilots attracted world attention as the 'new Elizabethans'. The Armada Memorial in Plymouth was constructed in 1888 to celebrate the tercentenary of the defeat of the Spanish Armada.

One of the greatest finds of the Spanish Armada was the remains of the wreck of La Girona, found by a team of Belgian divers off the coast of Portballintrae in 1968. It was the greatest treasure salvaged up until that time. Gold and silver coins, jewelry, armaments and other objects are on permanent display at the Ulster Museum (part of the National Museums of Northern Ireland) in Stranmillis in Belfast.

Historiography
With the distribution of flyers, pamphlets, the striking of victory medals, and numerous joyous celebrations, the complete success of the propaganda campaign, contributing to the "Black Legend", that followed the failure of the Spanish Armada is plain to see; not so the actual military campaign. On the basis of the propaganda campaign that had already started at the time of the conflict and the well-worn notions repeated in so many books, articles, documentaries and films, especially in the last 200 years, English historiography has reinforced a distorted view of what actually took place in 1588 and the circumstances that surrounded it. Moreover, there is no hesitation in using these historical misrepresentations even in modern times. Historian Knerr has reviewed the main trends in historiography over five centuries. For 150 years, writers relied heavily on Augustine Ryther's translation of Petruccio Ubaldini's Expeditionis Hispaniorum in Angliam vera Descriptio (A discourse concerninge the Spanishe fleete inuadinge Englande in the yeare 1588) (1590), which argued that God decisively favoured the Protestant cause. In the 17th century, William Camden additionally pointed to elements of English nationalism and the private enterprise of the sea dogs. He also emphasized that the Duke of Medina Sidonia was an incompetent seaman. In the 18th century, David Hume praised the leadership of Queen Elizabeth. However, the Whig historians, led by James A. Froude, rejected Hume's interpretation and argued that Elizabeth was vacillating and almost lost the conflict by her unwillingness to spend enough to maintain and supply the Royal Navy's fleet of ships. Scientific modern historiography came of age with the publication of two volumes of primary documents by John Knox Laughton in 1894. This enabled the leading naval scholar of the day, Julian Corbett, to reject the Whig views and turn attention to the professionalization of the Royal Navy as a critical factor. Twentieth-century historians have focused on technical issues, such as the comparative power of English and Spanish naval guns and the degree of credit for naval battle tactics that is owed to Francis Drake and Charles Howard. Inclement weather in the English Channel and on the oceans at the time has always been cited as a major factor to the outcome.

Notable participants
 William Adams served on the Richarde Dyffylde, a resupply ship during the campaign. In 1600, he was the first Englishman to reach (and settle in) Japan via the Dutch United East India Company (VOC) becoming one of the first of few Western Samurai.

In popular culture
The Armada has often featured in fictional accounts of the reign of Elizabeth I.  Examples are:
 The Battle of Gravelines and the subsequent chase around the northern coast of Scotland form the climax of Charles Kingsley's 1855 novel Westward Ho!, which in 1925 became the first novel to be adapted into a radio drama by BBC.
 The fifth episode of the BBC series Elizabeth R is an account of the defeat of the Armada.
 The 2007 film Elizabeth: The Golden Age contains a heavily fictionalized retelling of the Spanish Armada and the Battle of Gravelines.

See also

 Invisible armada
 The Armada Service
 Hugo of Moncada i Gralla
 Armada Tapestries
 Armada Memorial
 The English Mercurie

Notes

References

 
 
 
 
 Corbett, Julian S. Drake and the Tudor Navy: With a History of the Rise of England as a Maritime Power (1898) online edition vol. 1; also online edition vol. 2
 Cruikshank, Dan: Invasion: Defending Britain from Attack, Boxtree Ltd, 2002 
 
 
 
 
 
 Froude, James Anthony. The Spanish Story of the Armada, and Other Essays (1899), by a leading historian of the 1890s  full text online
 
 
 
 
 
 
 
 
 
 Kilfeather T. P.: Ireland: Graveyard of the Spanish Armada, Anvil Books Ltd, 1967
 Knerr, Douglas. "Through the "Golden Mist": a Brief Overview of Armada Historiography." American Neptune 1989 49(1): 5–13. 
 
 
 
 
 
 
 
 
 Martin, Colin (with appendices by Wignall, Sydney): Full Fathom Five: Wrecks of the Spanish Armada (with appendices by Sydney Wignall), Viking, 1975
 
 
 Parker, Geoffrey. "Why the Armada Failed." History Today 1988 38(may): 26–33. . Summary by leadfing historian.
 Pierson, Peter. Commander of the Armada: The Seventh Duke of Medina Sidonia. (1989). 304 pp.
 Rasor, Eugene L. The Spanish Armada of 1588: Historiography and Annotated Bibliography. (1992). 277 pp.
 
 Rodger, N. A. M. The Safeguard of the Sea: A Naval History of Britain 660–1649 vol 1 (1999) 691 pp; excerpt and text search
 Rodriguez-Salgado, M. J. and Adams, Simon, eds. England, Spain, and the Gran Armada, 1585–1604 (1991) 308 pp.
 
 
 Thompson, I. A. A. "The Appointment of the Duke of Medina Sidonia to the Command of the Spanish Armada", The Historical Journal, Vol. 12, No. 2. (1969), pp. 197–216. in JSTOR
 
 
 Alcalá-Zamora, José N. (2004). La empresa de Inglaterra: (la "Armada invencible" : fabulación y realidad). Taravilla: Real Academia de la Historia 

Further reading
 
 Graham, Winston. The Spanish Armadas (1972; reprint 2001) 
 Howarth, David. The Voyage of the Armada: The Spanish Story (1981). 
 Kilfeather T. P. Ireland: Graveyard of the Spanish Armada (Anvil Books, 1967)
 McDermott, James. England & the Spanish Armada: The Necessary Quarrel (1990) 
 McKee, Alexander. From Merciless Invaders: The Defeat of the Spanish Armada. Souvenir Press, London, 1963. Second edition, Grafton Books, London, 1988.
 Padfield, Peter. Armada: A Celebration of the Four Hundredth Anniversary of the Defeat of the Spanish Armada, 1588–1988. Gollancz (1988). 
 Parker, Geoffrey Mariner's Mirror. 'The Dreadnought Revolution of Tudor England', 82 (1996): pp. 269–300.
 Wernham A. B. The Return of the Armadas: the Later Years of the Elizabethan War against Spain, 1595–1603,  
 Whiting J. R. S. The Enterprise of England: The Spanish Armada'' (1988) Sutton Publishing (1995)

External links

 The Story of the Tobermory Spanish Galleon
 English translation of Francisco de Cuellar's account of his service in the Armada and on the run in Ireland
 Elizabeth I and the Spanish Armada – a learning resource and teachers notes from the British Library
 The story of the Armada battles with pictures from the House of Lords tapestries

 
Conflicts in 1588
Naval battles of the Anglo-Spanish War (1585–1604)
1588 in Europe
1588 in England
Tudor England
History of the Royal Navy
Maritime history of England
Invasions of England
Invasions by Spain
1588 in the Spanish Empire